Nothochilus is a monotypic genus of flowering plants belonging to the family Orobanchaceae. The only species is Nothochilus coccineus.

Its native range is Southeastern Brazil.

References

Orobanchaceae
Orobanchaceae genera
Monotypic Lamiales genera